Ángel Baltazar Sepúlveda Sánchez (born 15 February 1991), also known as El Cuate, is a Mexican professional footballer who plays as a forward for Liga MX club Querétaro.

Club career
Sepúlveda was born in Apatzingán, Michoacán. made his senior team debut on September 18, 2010, as a substitute in a match against Atlante in a 2 - 0 loss of Monarcas.

Sepúlveda scored his first goal on April 4, 2011, against Chiapas that gave Monarcas the win in a 2 - 1 victory. He scored his second and third goal against Tempête Football Club during the preliminary rounds of the first leg and second leg of the 2011–12 CONCACAF Champions League. On October 10, 2011, he scored his fourth goal Pachuca to tie the game 2-2 during a regular season matchup of the 2011–12 Mexican Primera División season. On December 4, 2011, he came off as a substitute yet again replacing the injured Miguel Sabah and scored two goals against Santos Laguna to tie up the aggregate score 4-4 but due to Santos Laguna's higher seeding on the league table they failed to advance for the final of the Liguilla

C.D Guadalajara announced the signing of Sepúlveda on 7 June 2018.

Career statistics

International

International goals
Scores and results list Mexico's goal tally first.

Honours
Querétaro
Copa MX: Apertura 2016

References

External links
 
 
 Ángel Sepúlveda at imscouting.com
 Ángel Sepúlveda at match-endirect.com
 
 

Indigenous Mexicans
Footballers from Michoacán
Mexican footballers
People from Apatzingán
1991 births
Living people
Liga MX players
Ascenso MX players
Atlético Morelia players
Toros Neza footballers
Atlante F.C. footballers
C.D. Guadalajara footballers
Club Necaxa footballers
Club Tijuana footballers
Association football forwards
Mexico international footballers
2017 CONCACAF Gold Cup players